The Tony Award for Best Revival was given to the best play, musical or non-musical, which had already appeared on Broadway in a previous production. It was presented from 1977, where it was called Most Innovative Production of a Revival and later Reproduction (Play or Musical) in 1980, until 1994, when it was split into the Best Revival of a Musical and the Best Revival of a Play.

If there are not enough revivals, it is possible under the current Tony rules for this category to return. Any time there are three play revivals and three musical revivals, the categories are automatically separated; if there are fewer, the Tony Awards Administration Committee may still choose to split up the categories.

Winners and nominees

1970s

1980s

1990s

See also
 Drama Desk Award for Outstanding Revival
 Drama Desk Award for Outstanding Revival of a Musical
 Drama Desk Award for Outstanding Revival of a Play
 Laurence Olivier Award for Best Musical Revival
 Laurence Olivier Award for Best Revival
 Tony Award for Best Revival of a Musical
 Tony Award for Best Revival of a Play

External links
 Tony Awards Official site
 Tony Awards at Internet Broadway database Listing
 Tony Awards at broadwayworld.com

Tony Awards
Awards established in 1977
1977 establishments in New York City
Awards disestablished in 1993
1993 disestablishments in the United States
1994 disestablishments in New York (state)